The black-winged saltator (Saltator atripennis) is a species of songbird found in Colombia and Ecuador. Its natural habitat is subtropical or tropical moist montane forests. While saltators were traditionally placed in the family Cardinalidae, they are now placed in the tanager family Thraupidae.

References

External links

Black-winged Saltator videos on the Internet Bird Collection
Black-winged Saltator photo gallery VIREO Photo-High Res--(Close-up)

black-winged saltator
Birds of the Colombian Andes
Birds of the Tumbes-Chocó-Magdalena
black-winged saltator
black-winged saltator
Taxonomy articles created by Polbot